Double Fantasy is the fifth album by John Lennon and Yoko Ono, released in November 1980 on Geffen Records. Produced by Lennon, Ono and Jack Douglas, it was the seventh and final studio album released by Lennon during his lifetime. The album marked Lennon's return to recording music full-time, following his five-year hiatus to raise his son Sean. Recording sessions took place at the Hit Factory in New York City between August and October 1980. The final album features songs from both Lennon and Ono, largely alternating between the two in its track listing. Other tracks recorded by Lennon from the sessions were compiled by Ono for release on Milk and Honey in 1984.

Upon its release, the album stalled on music charts and received largely negative reviews from music critics, with many focusing on the album's idealisation of Lennon and Ono's marriage. However, following Lennon's murder three weeks after its release, it became a worldwide commercial success and went on to win the 1981 Grammy Award for Album of the Year at the 24th Annual Grammy Awards in 1982. In subsequent decades, the album has been viewed favourably, with Lennon's songs in particular garnering praise as some of his finest.

In 2010, Ono and Douglas released a remix of the album, titled Double Fantasy Stripped Down, which featured less lavish production than the original.

Background
Following the birth of his son, Sean, in 1975, Lennon put his musical career on hold to raise him. After five years of little musical activity, aside from recording the occasional demo in his apartment in New York, Lennon resumed his career. 

In June of 1980, Lennon embarked on a sailing trip from Newport, Rhode Island to Bermuda. During the journey, the 43-foot schooner named Megan Jaye encountered a severe storm. One by one, the crew of five were overcome with fatigue and seasickness save for Lennon, who was eventually forced to take the wheel alone for six hours. It had the effect of both renewing his confidence and making him contemplate the fragility of life. As a result, he began to write new songs and reworked earlier demos. He commented later, "I was so centred after the experience at sea that I was tuned in to the cosmos – and all these songs came!" Ono also wrote many songs, inspired with new confidence after Lennon had stated that he believed that contemporary popular music, such as "Rock Lobster" by the B-52's, bore similarities to Ono's earlier work.

The couple decided to release their work on the same album, the first time they had done so since 1972's politically charged Some Time in New York City. In stark contrast to that album, Double Fantasy (subtitled A Heart Play) was a collection of songs wherein husband and wife would conduct a musical dialogue. The album took its title from a species of freesia, seen in the Bermuda Botanical Gardens, whose name Lennon regarded as a perfect description of his marriage to Ono.

Lennon was also inspired to return to music by his former songwriting partner within the Beatles. Upon hearing former bandmate Paul McCartney's 1980 single "Coming Up", Lennon deemed the song "a good piece of work." According to McCartney, the track prompted Lennon to return to recording later that year.

Recording
Ono approached producer Jack Douglas, with whom the couple had previously worked, and gave him Lennon's demos to listen to. "My immediate impressions were that I was going to have a hard time making it better than the demos because there was such intimacy in the demos," Douglas told Uncuts Chris Hunt in 2005.

Sessions for the album began at the Hit Factory in New York City on 7 August 1980 and continued until 19 October 1980. They produced dozens of songs, enough to fill Double Fantasy and a large part of a projected second album, Milk and Honey.

Lennon wanted to work with different musicians than he had previously, and had Douglas assemble and rehearse the band without telling them who they would be recording with.  While the sessions were underway, Douglas brought Rick Nielsen and Bun E. Carlos of the band Cheap Trick (whom he was also producing) to play on Lennon's "I'm Losing You" and Ono's "I'm Moving On", but these were eventually re-recorded with the studio musicians. (The Cheap Trick version of "I'm Losing You" was included on the John Lennon Anthology collection released in 1998.)

The sessions remained top secret. Lennon and Ono still were not signed to a record label and paid for the initial sessions themselves. After they were satisfied with the album, their publicist Bruce Replogle leaked the news that the couple were back in the studio again.

Immediately, Lennon was inundated with offers from all the major labels. The recording industry was shocked when the couple signed with the newly formed Geffen Records on 22 September 1980 because David Geffen shrewdly insisted on speaking with Ono first and regarded her contributions as equal to Lennon's. He signed them before hearing any of the tracks.

Release, reception and aftermath
The album was preceded by the single "(Just Like) Starting Over", which was backed with Ono's "Kiss Kiss Kiss". It was released on 20 October 1980 in the United States, and four days later in the United Kingdom. Originally peaking at number 8 in the UK chart, after Lennon's murder the single reached number one. In the US, the single was inching upward in the top 10 before reaching number one following Lennon's death.

The album was released on 17 November 1980 in both the UK and US. Geffen had planned an elaborate cover for Lennon's comeback, but Ono could not decide on a photo.  Not wanting to miss the Christmas release deadline, Geffen used the single sleeve as the front cover, while choosing an outtake from the same photo session for the back. The tracks were sequenced as a dialogue between Lennon and Ono; one of his songs followed by one of hers. On the initial pressings, the track listing was out of sequence on the album cover. Initial sales were sluggish. In the UK album charts, it had peaked at number 14 then slipped to number 46, while in the US, it had risen to number 11. Upon Lennon's murder, the album jumped to number 1 in the US Billboard chart, where it stayed for eight weeks, and in the UK, it jumped to number 2, where it remained for seven weeks before finally spending two weeks at number 1.

"Woman", chosen by Lennon, was released as a posthumous single, backed with Ono's "Beautiful Boys". It was released on 12 January 1981 in the US and 16 January in the UK, reaching number 1 in the UK and in the US on the Cash Box singles chart, while peaking at number 2 for three weeks on the Billboard Hot 100. Released as the final single from the album, "Watching the Wheels", backed with Ono's "Yes, I'm Your Angel", peaked at number 10 and 30 in the US and UK charts respectively. The single was released in the US on 13 March 1981, and on 27 March 1981 in the UK.

Lennon's Bermuda trip and Double Fantasy inspired the 2013 tribute CD and book Lennon Bermuda.

 Critical reception 

Initial critical reaction to the album was largely negative. However, three weeks after the album's release, Lennon was murdered and several negative reviews by prominent critics were withheld from publication, including those by Stephen Holden of The New York Times, Tom Carson of Rolling Stone, and Geoffrey Stokes of The Village Voice. The negative reviews focused on the album's idealisation of Lennon and Ono's marriage. Stokes found the concept and theme to be "basically misogynist" and Kit Rachlis of the Boston Phoenix admitted to being "annoyed" by Lennon and Ono's assumption "that lots of people care deeply" about them. Charles Shaar Murray, of New Musical Express, wrote that the couple's domestic bliss "sounds like a great life but unfortunately it makes a lousy record," adding that he wished Lennon had "kept his big happy trap shut until he has something to say that was even vaguely relevant to those of us not married to Yoko Ono".

Double Fantasy finished 37th in The Village Voices 1980 Pazz & Jop, an annual poll of prominent music critics. Robert Christgau, the poll's creator, ranked it 7th on his own list of the year's best albums. Although he was put off by its simplistic lyrics and music upon first listen, Christgau said the music works a "minor miracle" with "rich, precise" song form and a "command of readymades" to put "the anonymous usages of studio rock to striking artistic purpose". He felt that the use of alternating Ono's improved vocals with Lennon's "makes the union come alive" better than his outspoken, straightforward lyrics and concluded that the album is not great but "memorable and gratifying" as rare, "connubial rock and roll". In his retrospective review for AllMusic, Stephen Thomas Erlewine comments: "these are really nice tunes and what's special about them is their niceness – it's a sweet acceptance of middle age, which, of course, makes [Lennon's] assassination all the sadder."

In 1982, Douglas, Lennon and Ono won the 1981 Grammy Award for Album of the Year for Double Fantasy at the 24th Annual Grammy Awards. In 1989, the album was ranked number 29 on Rolling Stone magazine's list of the 100 greatest albums of the 1980s.

In 2020, Rolling Stone included Double Fantasy in their "80 Greatest albums of 1980" list, praising Lennon and Ono for their collaboration as "each song acts as a dialogue between the couple."

Reissues
"Beautiful Boy (Darling Boy)" was re-released as the B-side to a reissue of "Happy Xmas (War Is Over)" to promote The John Lennon Collection in November 1982. It was first released on CD on 13 October 1986 in the UK, and nearly a year later on 15 September 1987 in the US. The album was re-released on cassette, CD and vinyl in 1989, after EMI had obtained the rights to the album. On 9 October 2000, EMI/Capitol released a remastered version of the album, containing three bonus tracks.

In 2010, Ono and Douglas supervised the release of a remix of the album called Double Fantasy Stripped Down. Released as a two-disc set, it included a newly remastered copy of the original album along with an alternative version of the album featuring simpler arrangements without the original's lavish production, with cover artwork by Sean Lennon. Ono said of the remix: "This new version really allows us to focus our attention on John's amazing vocals. Technology has advanced so much that, conversely, I wanted to use new techniques to really frame these amazing songs and John’s voice as simply as possible. By stripping down some of the instrumentation, the power of the songs shines through with an enhanced clarity." Stephen Thomas Erlewine of AllMusic gave the remix a mixed review, writing: "Apart from '(Just Like) Starting Over', where the removal of the doo-wop backing vocals undercuts the loving oldies homage of the song, the changes [made] are so subtle that they're felt more than heard, cumulatively not affecting the impact of the album all that much." He completed his review by stating, "Ultimately, Stripped Down sounds like a rough mix waiting for all the polish that made Double Fantasy feel like a full, complete album."

Track listing

Bonus tracks

2010 mixes

A^''' On initial pressings of the album, "Yes, I'm Your Angel" was simply titled "I'm Your Angel". It was re-titled when it was released as the B-side to "Watching the Wheels", and all reissues and remasters of Double Fantasy list the track as "Yes, I'm Your Angel".https://images.45worlds.com/f/ab/john-lennon-and-yoko-ono-kiss-kiss-kiss-geffen-2-ab.jpg 

Accolades

Grammy Awards

|-
| style="width:35px; text-align:center;" rowspan="3"|1982 || rowspan="2"| Double Fantasy || Album of the Year || 
|-
| Best Pop Vocal Performance – Male || 
|-
|"(Just Like) Starting Over" || |Record of the Year || 
|-

Personnel
Credits per the album's sleeve notes.

Musicians
John Lennon – lead, harmony and background vocals, rhythm guitar, acoustic guitar, piano, keyboards, synthesiser
Yoko Ono – lead and background vocals
Earl Slick – lead guitar
Hugh McCracken – lead guitar
Tony Levin – bass guitar
George Small – keyboards, piano, synthesiser 
Andy Newmark – drums
Arthur Jenkins – percussion
Ed Walsh – Oberheim synthesiser
Randy Stein – English concertina
Robert Greenidge – steel drum on "Beautiful Boy"
Matthew Cunningham – hammer dulcimer on "Watching the Wheels"
Howard Johnson – horns
Grant Hungerford – horns
John Parran – horns
Seldon Powell – horns
George "Young" Opalisky – horns
Roger Rosenberg – horns
David Tofani – horns
Ronald Tooley – horns
Cas Mijac (Michelle Simpson, Cassandra Wooten, Cheryl Mason Jacks) – background vocals
Eric Troyer – background vocals
Benny Cummings Singers – background vocals
The Kings Temple Choir – background vocals

Technical
Jack Douglas – arranger, producer
John Lennon – arranger, producer
Yoko Ono – arranger, producer
Tony Davilio – horn arrangements, musical associate
Toshihiro Hamaya – production assistant
Frederic Seaman – production assistant
Julie Last – assistant engineer
George Marino – original mastering and remastering
Lee DeCarlo – engineer
Jon Smith – assistant engineer
James A. Ball – assistant engineer
Kishin Shinoyama – cover photo and photography
Christopher Whorf – artwork

Charts

Weekly charts

Year-end charts

Certifications and sales

References
 Footnotes

 Citations

 Bibliography

 

External links

 Double Fantasy at Graham Calkin's Beatles Pages
 Just Like Starting Over The Recording Of Double Fantasy by Chris Hunt, published in Uncut John Lennon Special'', 2005

John Lennon albums
Yoko Ono albums
1980 albums
Capitol Records albums
Geffen Records albums
Grammy Award for Album of the Year
Juno Award for International Album of the Year albums
Albums produced by Jack Douglas (record producer)
Albums arranged by John Lennon
Albums produced by John Lennon
Albums arranged by Jack Douglas (record producer)
Albums arranged by Yoko Ono
Albums produced by Yoko Ono